Robert Gill (born February 27, 1984) is an American football wide receiver who is currently a free agent. Gill did not play college football.

College career
Gill played basketball at Texas A&M University–Corpus Christi before transferring to Texas State, where he competed in track & field, running the 200-meter dash in 21.14 seconds and the 400-meter dash in 46.52 seconds.

Professional career
Gill signed with the Green Bay Blizzard but was cut before the 2008 af2 season started. He signed with the Louisville Fire but never played for them and was traded to the Texas Copperheads. After two games with the Copperheads, Gill was released and signed by the Lubbock Renegades. In July 2009, Gill signed with the Milwaukee Iron. He played for the Abilene Ruff Riders in 2010. He played for the Kansas City Command in 2011 and 2012. Gill signed with the Arizona Cardinals in April 2013. In June 2013, Gill posted a video of himself running 25 mph on a treadmill to YouTube. The video has over 3,000,000 views. The Cardinals released Gill and Robby Toma on August 21, 2013. Gill signed with the Toronto Argonauts prior to the 2014 season. He was released by the Argonauts on November 11, 2014.

Personal life
His mother, Marie, moved to San Antonio from Panama.

References

External links
Toronto Argonauts bio

1984 births
Living people
American players of Canadian football
Canadian football wide receivers
Players of American football from San Antonio
Players of Canadian football from San Antonio
American football wide receivers
Basketball players from San Antonio
Track and field athletes from San Antonio
Texas A&M–Corpus Christi Islanders men's basketball players
Texas State Bobcats men's track and field athletes
Milwaukee Iron players
Dallas Vigilantes players
Abilene Ruff Riders players
Kansas City Command players
Toronto Argonauts players
American men's basketball players